Colquemarca (Quechua: Qullqi Marka, meaning 'silver town') is one of eight districts of the Chumbivilcas Province in Peru.

Geography 
Other mountains are listed below:

Ethnic groups 
The people in the district are mainly indigenous citizens of Quechua descent. Quechua is the language which the majority of the population (92.41%) learnt to speak in childhood, 7.21% of the residents started speaking using the Spanish language (2007 Peru Census).

See also 
 Qañawimayu

References